This list contains all active clubs in Estonia in 2017

Main Teams

See also
List of football clubs in Estonia

Notes

 
Football clubs
Estonia
Lists of organizations based in Estonia